Martin Poustka (born 2 December 1975) is a Czech football manager, who is currently working for Slavia Prague.

Poustka was announced as the caretaker manager of Gambrinus liga side Slavia Prague in March 2012, following the resignation of František Straka, who he had previously served under as assistant manager. At the age of 36, he became the fourth-youngest Slavia manager in history. Poustka was appointed until a permanent appointment could be made. However, after Vítězslav Lavička refused an offer to take over, Poustka's spell continued.

References

1975 births
Living people
Czech footballers
Czech football managers
Czech First League managers
SK Slavia Prague managers
Footballers from Prague
Association footballers not categorized by position
SK Slavia Prague non-playing staff